WIGN (1550 kHz) is a commercial AM radio station broadcasting a radio format of Bluegrass Music, Southern Gospel Music and Christian talk and teaching.  Licensed to Bristol, Tennessee, United States, it serves the Tri-Cites -  Johnson City - Kingsport and Bristol areas of Tennessee and Virginia.   The station is owned by Mountain Music Ministries, LLC.

By day, WIGN is powered at 35,000 watts non-directional.  But 1550 AM is a Canadian and Mexican clear-channel frequency.  So to reduce interference, WIGN must greatly reduce nighttime power to 6 watts.  WIGN also broadcasts on a 250 watt FM translator, 92.1 MHz W221EC.

History
On , the station first signed on the air.  It was originally a daytimer, required to go off the air at sunset.  It later received low-power nighttime authorization.  For much of its history, it has broadcast a mix of Classic Country, Southern Gospel and Bluegrass music.

References

External links

Gospel radio stations in the United States
IGN
Radio stations established in 1974